William Greenwood may refer to:

Will Greenwood (born 1972), rugby player
William Greenwood (Blessed), one of the Carthusian Martyrs, executed 1537
William Greenwood (politician) (1875–1925), MP for Stockport
Bill Greenwood (baseball) (1857–1902), baseball player
William Greenwood (cricketer) (1798–1872), English cricketer
William Osborne Greenwood (1873–1947), British surgeon and a minister of religion